Duane Da Rocha Marcé (born 7 January 1988) is a Brazilian-born Spanish swimmer. She has received medals for the Mediterranean Games, World Championships and European Championships.

She won the 200 metres backstroke gold medal in the 2014 European Swimming Championships in Berlin (Germany).

She was born in Brasília, Distrito Federal, to a Brazilian mother (Soraia da Rocha) and a Spanish father (José María Marcé).

References

1988 births
Living people
Sportspeople from Brasília
Sportspeople of Brazilian descent
Brazilian expatriate sportspeople in Spain
Brazilian people of Spanish descent
Spanish female backstroke swimmers
Olympic swimmers of Spain
Swimmers at the 2012 Summer Olympics
Swimmers at the 2016 Summer Olympics
Medalists at the FINA World Swimming Championships (25 m)
European Aquatics Championships medalists in swimming
Brazilian emigrants to Spain

Mediterranean Games silver medalists for Spain
Swimmers at the 2009 Mediterranean Games
Swimmers at the 2018 Mediterranean Games
Universiade medalists in swimming
Mediterranean Games medalists in swimming
Universiade bronze medalists for Spain